This is a list of cheeses from, or connected with, Norway.

Brunost cheeses
A caramelized brown Norwegian whey cheese. Brunost (brown cheese) is commonly used instead of mysost (whey cheese). It is regarded as one of Norway's most iconic foodstuffs, and is considered an important part of Norwegian gastronomical and cultural identity and heritage.

 Brunost / Mysost – brunost is made by boiling a mixture of milk, cream, and whey carefully for several hours so that the water evaporates. The heat turns the milk sugars into caramel, which gives the cheese its characteristic brown colour and sweetness.
 Fløtemysost – a type of brunost or brown cheese made from cow's milk.
 Gudbrandsdalsost – a type of brunost consisting of goat milk added to fløtemysost.
 Geitost – cheese made from whey, milk and cream from goat.
 Ekte geitost ("true goat cheese") – goat cheese containing only goat milk and whey.
 Heidal cheese – a dark brown brunost from Heidal with a decorative pattern molded on the cheese block.
  - Misværost is a goat cheese that is browned very little, it therefore has a light, almost yellow color, and a very mild taste.
 Primost - a slightly brown cheese made from cow's milk which has a soft spreadable texture.

Norwegian cheeses

 Gamalost - gamalost, which translates as "old cheese", is a pungent traditional Norwegian cheese.
 Jarlsberg cheese - a mild cheese made from cow's-milk, with large, regular eyes, originating from Jarlsberg, Norway.
 Kraftkar - a blue cheese from Tingvoll in Nordmøre, Western Norway, made from unskimmed cow's milk and cream, with injected culture of the mold Penicillium roqueforti.
 Kvarg - a type of fresh dairy product made by warming soured milk until the desired amount of curdling is achieved, and then straining it.
 Normanna - a solid blue cheese, the taste is aromatic and powerful. Normanna is sliceable with a razor when it is cold, and spreadable when it is temperate.
 Norvegia - a cow's milk cheese similar to Gouda, it has a mild taste and melts easily.
  - a blue cheese with a supple, almost buttery consistency and aromatic and full-bodied.
 Nøkkelost - a semi-hard, yellow cheese flavoured with cumin and cloves. It is made from cow's milk, in the shape of wheels or blocks, with a maturation period of three months.
 Nøkkelost - a soft, mature sour milk cheese flavored with caraway seeds.
 Pultost - a soft, mature sour milk cheese flavored with caraway seeds.
 Ridderost - a smear-ripened cheese with soft and supple consistency.
 Selbu - a versatile blue cheese, that goes well on bread or on its own.
 Skjørost - a fresh curd of sour skim milk.
 Snøfrisk - a goat cheese soft enough to be used as a spread. It comes in several flavours, including original, juniper berry, dill and forest mushrooms.
 Søst - has a semi-solid and easily cutable consistency. The taste is round, sweet and caramel-like.

Norway